Amanda Vazquez (born ) is a Puerto Rican female volleyball player. She is part of the Puerto Rico women's national volleyball team.

She participated in the 2014 FIVB Volleyball World Grand Prix.
On club level she played for Mayaguez in 2014.

References

External links
 FIVB Profile

1984 births
Living people
Puerto Rican women's volleyball players
People from Honolulu County, Hawaii
Middle blockers
21st-century American women
UC Irvine Anteaters women's volleyball players